CNTA may refer to:
 China National Tourism Administration
 Citizens for Nuclear Technology Awareness
 Central Nevada Test Area
 Central Nova Tourist Association
 National centre for advanced transportation (Canada)